Grevillea pterosperma, commonly known as desert grevillea  or desert spider-flower, is a species of flowering plant in the family Proteaceae and is endemic to continental Australia. It is an erect, rounded shrub with linear leaves, sometimes divided with up to six linear lobes, and cylindrical clusters of greyish white and creamy white flowers with a cream-coloured to pale yellow style.

Description
The upper surface has 3 to 5 longitudinal grooves, and the edges are rolled under, obscuring the lower surface.

TaxonomyGrevillea pterosperma was first formally described in 1854 by Victorian Government Botanist Ferdinand von Mueller, in Transactions of the Philosophical Society of Victoria, based on plants observed "[I]n the Mallee scrub on sandhills towards the junction of the Murray and Murrumbidgee". The specific epithet (pterosperma'') means "wing-seeded".

Distribution and habitat
Desert grevillea grows on and between sand dunes and on sandplains and in shrublands, woodlands and mallee in mostly inland areas of the Northern Territory and all mainland states, except Queensland.

References

pterosperma
Proteales of Australia
Flora of New South Wales
Flora of the Northern Territory
Flora of South Australia
Flora of Victoria (Australia)
Eudicots of Western Australia
Taxa named by Ferdinand von Mueller
Plants described in 1854